Black Pantera is a Brazilian crossover thrash band founded in Uberaba, Minas Gerais, in early 2014. Formed by Charles Gama (guitar, vocals), Chaene da Gama (bass) and Rodrigo "Pancho" Augusto (drums), all of them African-Brazilians, the band discusses topics such as politics, racism and discrimination in general in its lyrics, among other topics; its name is inspired by the Black Panthers.

Influenced by Bad Brains, Rage Against the Machine, Tupac, Motörhead, James Brown, Metallica, Living Colour, Raimundos, Sepultura and Devotos, their sound has elements of thrash metal, hardcore punk and crossover thrash.

They performed in festivals such as  Afropunk and Download, besides having opened for or performed with Dead Fish, System of a Down, Slayer, Project46, O Rappa and Sepultura, with shows in Colombia, France, Italy and the United States.

History 
The band was formed in April 2014 in Uberaba, Minas Gerais, by brothers Charles Gama (guitar, vocals, lyrics) and Chaene da Gama (bass) along with their friend and drummer Rodrigo "Pancho" Augusto. Initially, Chaene and Rodrigo had refused joining the band, but later changed their minds after hearing the first materials prepared by Charles. The first, self-titled album, came out in 2015. Work on the album began with the band's inception and lasted for 17 months, with the album being released in October.

In 2016, they performed at the French edition of the Afropunk Festival and had to promote a crowdfunding campaign in order to help them cover the traveling expenses. In 2018, they released their second album, Agressão, preceded by a video of "Prefácio". In the beginning of the next year, they released the track "Punk Rock Nigga Roll", along with its video, and then they signed with Deckdisc, after producer Rafael Ramos watched them perform live with Dead Fish. Around that time, they were planning an album for 2020.

During a tour in Europe, they believe they suffered racial discrimination in a gas station in Italy, in which they were searched by a group of police officers who did not do the same with any of the many other clients that were there at the time. According to the musicians, the officers pointed a number of irregularities (which they denied) about the van they charted and they allegedly laughed as the band left the station on a tower.

In June 2020, soon after the murder of George Floyd, they released the song "I Can't Breathe", its title alluding to the sentence repeated by Floyd as a police officer knelt on his neck. The footage of the incident was watched by Charles on 27 May, which inspired him to write the song. Two days later, the band got together to record the song and its video. "I Can't Breathe" also criticizes other police brutality episodes, such as those which resulted in the deaths of Brazilian children João Pedro and Ágatha Felix.

The video, directed by Leonardo Ramalho from Pajé Filmes (who had already directed the video for "Punk Rock Nigga Roll"), shows Charles being strangled by a single white hand; the idea conveyed is that black people, despite being the majority of the World's population, are still on racists' mercy.

Still in 2020, they released the EP Capítulo Negro (Black Chapter), with covers of "Identidade", by Jorge Aragão; "Todo Camburão Tem um Pouco de Navio Negreiro", by O Rappa; and "A Carne", by Farofa Carioca, made famous by Elza Soares.

On 10 October 2020, they took part in the first on-line edition of the event "Sim à Igualdade Racial" (Yes to Racial Equality), organized by the Instituto Identidade Brasil. In the following month, they would participate in the first Brazilian edition of Afropunk, but it was cancelled due to the COVID-19 pandemic and converted in an on-line event to be hosted by the end of October.

On 1 February 2022, Black Pantera was announced as part of the line-up of the Sunset Stage of Rock in Rio 2022, alongside Devotos. The invitation had been made in 2020, but the band was prevented from revealing it due to a non-disclosure agreement. Following their invitation, they were invited by newspaper O Globo to interview Living Colour.

Discography 
Studio albums
 Project Black Pantera (2015)
 Agressão (2019)
 Ascensão (2022)

EP
 Capítulo Negro (2020)

Live albums
 Black Pantera no Estúdio Showlivre (Ao Vivo) (2018)

References

External links 
 Interview of Living Colour by Black Pantera on O Globo (in Portuguese)

Musical trios
Uberaba
Musical groups from Minas Gerais
Musical groups established in 2014
Crossover thrash groups
Brazilian hardcore punk groups
Brazilian thrash metal musical groups
2014 establishments in Brazil
Afro-Brazilian musicians